Will Hermes (born December 27, 1960, in Jamaica, Queens, New York City) is an American author, broadcaster, journalist and critic who has written extensively about popular music. He is a longtime contributor to Rolling Stone and to National Public Radio's All Things Considered. His work has also appeared in Spin, The New York Times, The Village Voice, The Believer, GQ, Salon, Entertainment Weekly, Details, City Pages (Minneapolis, MN), The Windy City Times, and Option.  He is the author of Love Goes To Buildings On Fire: Five Years in New York That Changed Music Forever (2011), a history of the New York City music scene in the 1970s.

Background and career
In the late 1980s Hermes began writing for Option, a Los Angeles-based small-press magazine that covered a wide range of music. In 1993 he became the Arts & Music Editor for City Pages, an alternative newsweekly based in Minneapolis. In 1997 was hired as a Senior Editor for Spin magazine in New York City. Hermes began contributing regularly to Rolling Stone in the ‘00s and became a frequent voice in the magazine's review section. Hermes co-edited SPIN: 20 Years of Alternative Music, an anthology of writing from Spin magazine published in 2006, with Sia Michel, then the magazine's editor-in-chief. His writing was included in Da Capo's Best Music Writing 2006 and Best Music Writing 2007. In 2011, Farrar, Straus and Giroux/Faber and Faber published his book Love Goes To Buildings On Fire: Five Years in New York That Changed Music Forever, a history of New York City music culture in the 1970s, covering the nascent punk rock, hip hop and disco scenes, along with salsa, loft jazz, and the downtown composers known as minimalists. It was selected as the top music book of 2011 by NPR, and it was an Editor's Choice title in The New York Times Book Review, which called it a "prodigious work of contemporary music history".

Bibliography

Books

 Love Goes To Buildings On Fire: Five Years in New York That Changed Music Forever. Farrar, Straus and Giroux/Faber and Faber, 2011.

Essays and reporting

References

External links

 Love Goes To Buildings On Fire blog
 NPR review of ''Love Goes To Buildings On Fire"
 New York Times review of Love Goes To Buildings On Fire
Interview on The Next Track podcast

1960 births
Living people
American music critics
American music journalists
Rolling Stone people